Pennsylvania Route 90 can refer to:
 Pennsylvania Route 90 (1920s-1960s), now numbered 191
 New Jersey Route 90, which becomes an unnumbered road in Pennsylvania
 Interstate 90 in Pennsylvania - the current route with the SR 90 designation.
 Pulaski Expressway - a planned expressway, which was supposed to have the PA 90 designation.

090